Mac Giolla Seanáin was the name of an Irish brehon family.

Originally of Tyrone, members of the Mac Giolla Seanáin family spread into Leinster. It is now found as Gilsenan, Gilshenan, Gilshannon and several other variants.

See also

 Fedlim Mac Giolla Seanáin, d. 1507.

External links
 http://www.irishtimes.com/ancestor/surname/index.cfm?fuseaction=Go.&UserID=

Surnames
Irish families
Irish Brehon families
Surnames of Irish origin
Irish-language masculine surnames
Families of Irish ancestry